The Australasian Schools Writing Competition is a competition open to school students in years 3–12 in Australia and New Zealand. It requires participants to write in a specific genre, which changes every year, based on supplied stimulus material. The length of entries depends on the year level...
It is run by the University of New South Wales Educational Testing Centre.

Education competitions in Australia
Writing contests